FFSS may refer to:

 "FF.SS." – Cioè: "...che mi hai portato a fare sopra a Posillipo se non mi vuoi più bene?", an Italian film
 Swiss Federal Railways, the railway in Switzerland
 Fenelon Falls Secondary School, a high school in Fenelon Falls, Ontario, Canada
 Flat-for-Sale Scheme, a housing development scheme by Hong Kong Housing Society in 1980s
 Free Funeral Service Society, a Burmese funeral service organization
 FFSS. Föreningen För en Segelfri Skärgård

See also

 FFS
 FS